Kordabad-e Sofla (also Romanized as Kordābād-e Soflá) is a village in Yusefvand Rural District, in the Central District of Selseleh County, Lorestan Province, Iran. At the 2006 census, its population was 27, in 5 families.

References 

Towns and villages in Selseleh County